Cepora himiko is a butterfly in the family Pieridae. It is found on the Mentawai Islands.

References
  (1994). A list of butterflies from Mentawai Islands, Indonesia (4). Fuatao 16: 10-11.

Pierini
Butterflies of Indonesia
Endemic fauna of Indonesia
Fauna of Sumatra
Mentawai Islands Regency
Butterflies described in 1994